Ľubomíra Balážová (born 13 August, 1968) is a Slovakian cross-country skier who competed from 1988 to 1998. Competing in three Winter Olympics, she earned her best overall and individual finishes in Albertville in 1992 with a sixth in the 4 × 5 km relay and 11th in the 5 km event.

Balážová's best finish at the FIS Nordic World Ski Championships was 14th in the 15 km event at Falun in 1993. Her best World cup finish was tenth in a 5 km event in Sweden in 1992.

Cross-country skiing results
All results are sourced from the International Ski Federation (FIS).

Olympic Games

World Championships

World Cup

References

External links

Women's 4 x 5 km cross-country relay Olympic results: 1976-2002 

1968 births
Living people
Slovak female cross-country skiers
Czechoslovak female cross-country skiers
Olympic cross-country skiers of Czechoslovakia
Olympic cross-country skiers of Slovakia
Cross-country skiers at the 1988 Winter Olympics
Cross-country skiers at the 1992 Winter Olympics
Cross-country skiers at the 1994 Winter Olympics
Universiade medalists in cross-country skiing
Universiade gold medalists for Slovakia
Competitors at the 1993 Winter Universiade
People from Poprad District
Sportspeople from the Prešov Region